Dichomeris aculata is a moth in the family Gelechiidae. It was described by Kyu-Tek Park in 2001. It is found in Taiwan.

The length of the forewings is about 6.5 mm. The forewings are reddish orange, speckled with dark brown scales and there is a small stigma near the middle of the cell. The hindwings are grey.

References

Moths described in 2001
acrolychna